Macaracas District is a district (distrito) of Los Santos Province in Panama. The population according to the 2000 census was 9,137. The district covers a total area of 504 km². The capital lies at the city of Macaracas.

The Macaracas style of Gran Coclé Precolumbian pottery was named for  archaeological sites found in this District.

Administrative divisions
Macaracas District is divided administratively into the following corregimientos:

Macaracas (capital)
Bahía Honda
Bajos de Guera
Corozal
Chupa
El Cedro
Espino Amarillo
La Mesa
Llano de Piedra
Las Palmas
Mogollón

...

References

Districts of Panama
Los Santos Province